Blennodia is a genus of flowering plants belonging to the family Brassicaceae.

Its native range is Australia.

Species:

Blennodia canescens 
Blennodia pterosperma

References

Brassicaceae
Brassicaceae genera